SPB Colony (Seshasayee Paper and Boards Colony) is a residential locality in the Urban Agglomeration of Erode in Indian state of Tamil Nadu. The colony consists of housing for the employees of Seshasayee Paper. The colony houses a park, public recreational house and community center.

Villages in Erode district